Vadakkur South is a village in the Orathanadu taluk of Thanjavur district, Tamil Nadu, India.

Demographics 

As per the 2001 census, Vadakkur South had a total population of 1917 with 924 males and 993 females. The sex ratio was 1075. The literacy rate was 68.11.

Sub-villages
Vadakkur South had the following sub-villages: Chellampatti (Chellampatty), Iyyampatty, Karupatypatty (Karuppattipatti), and Saravan Theru.

References 

 

Villages in Thanjavur district